Herminio Alonso Blanco Mendoza (born July 25, 1950 in Chihuahua) is a Mexican economist.

Herminio Blanco has 27 years of experience in international trade. As Mexico’s Minister of Trade and Industry, NAFTA Chief Negotiator and Vice Minister of International Negotiations, he played a role in the design and implementation of recent structural changes to Mexico's economy.

He directed the team that made Mexico the country with more free trade agreements in the world (34 countries at that time).

The current administration under Enrique Peña Nieto that brought the institutional revolutionary party (PRI) back to power in 2012 began active promotion of Blanco's candidacy to head the World Trade Organization during the Davos economic forum in 2013.

Many political analysts in Mexico believe that this promotion is a continuation or a proxy of former President Salinas de Gortari's failed candidacy to lead such organization, after significant controversy in connection with the end of President Salina's administration.  Mr. Blanco is a close friend and collaborator of President Salinas.

The following are some of the main achievements of his 15 years of service in the Mexican Government (1985-2000):

 As Chief Trade Negotiator, he led Mexico’s participation in the Uruguay Round of multilateral trade negotiations and the establishment of the World Trade Organization (WTO).
 He was the Head of the team that, at that time, made Mexico the country with the largest number of free trade agreements in the world (32 countries).
 He was responsible for the Mexican government’s lobbying efforts for the approval of NAFTA in the US Congress
 Implemented many of the promotion efforts that contributed to the tripling of foreign direct investment in Mexico.
 Designed and implemented a far-reaching reform program to eliminate red tape, enhance efficiency and increase transparency in Mexico’s public sector. 
 Implemented a managerial re-engineering of the Ministry of Trade and Industry, which was recognized by the ISO9000 certification and the Government of Mexico Quality Award.  
 Designed and implemented numerous programs to improve the competitiveness of small and medium size enterprises (SME’s), including the establishment of a consulting corporation with more than fifty offices in Mexico.

In his 12 years of experience in the private sector (2001-2012), Herminio Blanco has advised national and local governments, corporations and international organizations on trade policy and international economic strategic matters.

Herminio Blanco is founder and President of the Board of IQOM Inteligencia Comercial, the only international trade service in Mexico and Latin America that provides an online day-by-day analysis of governmental trade measures affecting corporations doing business in the region. IQOM has helped the Mexican government in the implementation of special software applications to promote the participation of small and medium enterprises in international trade.
He is a member of several boards, including BLADEX, the Latin American Trade Bank whose mission is to finance international trade in Latin America.

Candidate to the post of World Trade Organization Director-General

At a meeting of the 157 member countries of the General Council of the World Trade Organization (WTO) and observer countries today, Herminio Blanco Mendoza presented his candidacy for the post of WTO Director-General.

Dr. Blanco explained his short-, medium- and long-term proposals, stressing that development would play a key role in each time period.

 Short-term horizon: The ninth Ministerial Conference to be held in December 2013 in Bali, Indonesia, must be a success, with concrete results on substantive issues.
 Medium-term horizon: The Members should address the outstanding issues of the Doha Round and make the various WTO bodies more efficient in meeting their objectives.
 Long-term horizon: The solutions offered by regional trade agreements to the new realities and measures affecting trade in goods and services must become part of the multilateral trading system.

Dr. Blanco said that the WTO has succeeded in promoting trade as a dynamic engine of economic growth and development in its member countries, and has helped alleviate protectionist pressures arising from the global financial crisis. He also said that, although the Doha Round has not made progress, the WTO must be rescued from the risk of becoming irrelevant.

Professional Experience

 
Academic Experience

Personal
Blanco earned a B.A. in Economics from Instituto Tecnológico y de Estudios Superiores de Monterrey in 1971 and Ph.D. in Economics from the University of Chicago in 1978. He is married and has two children. He is fluent in English and Spanish and has full understanding of French.

References

External links
 
 

1950 births
Living people
20th-century Mexican economists
People from Chihuahua (state)
Monterrey Institute of Technology and Higher Education alumni
Mexican Secretaries of Commerce and Industry
21st-century Mexican economists